Wing Commander Rakesh Sharma, AC (born 13 January 1949) is a former Indian Air Force pilot who flew aboard Soyuz T-11 on 3 April 1984 as part of the Soviet Interkosmos programme. He is the only Indian citizen to travel in space, although there have been other astronauts of Indian origin who travelled to space, who were not Indian citizens. Another Air Force pilot, Ravish Malhotra, was placed on standby.

Early life
Born on 13 January 1949 in Patiala of present-day Punjab, India into a Punjabi Hindu Brahmin family. Sharma attended St. George's Grammar School, Hyderabad and graduated from Nizam College, Hyderabad. He joined the National Defence Academy as an air force plebe in July 1966 and was commissioned into the Indian Air Force as a pilot in 1970.

Career

IAF career
An alumnus of the 35thNational Defence Academy, Sharma joined the Indian Air Force as a test pilot in 1970 and progressed through numerous levels where in 1984 he was promoted to the rank of squadron leader. He was selected on 20September 1982 to become a cosmonaut and go into space as part of a joint programme between the Indian Air Force and the Soviet Interkosmos space programme.

Astronaut

In 1984, Sharma became the first Indian citizen to enter space when he flew aboard the Soviet rocket Soyuz T-11 launched from Baikonur Cosmodrome in the Kazakh Soviet Socialist Republic on 3 April 1984. The Soyuz T-11 spacecraft carrying cosmonauts including Sharma docked and transferred the three member Soviet-Indian international crew, consisting of the ship's commander, Yury Malyshev, and flight engineer, Gennadi Strekalov, to the  Salyut 7 Orbital Station. Sharma spent 7days, 21hours, and 40minutes aboard the Salyut 7 during which his team conducted scientific and technical studies which included forty-threeexperimental sessions. His work was mainly in the fields of bio-medicine and remote sensing. The crew held a joint television news conference with officials in Moscow and then Indian Prime Minister Indira Gandhi. When Indira Gandhi asked Sharma how India looked from outer space, he replied, "Sare Jahan Se Accha" (the best in the world). This is the title of a patriotic poem by Iqbal that had been written when India was under British colonial rule, that continues to be popular today. With Sharma's voyage aboard Soyuz T-11, India became the 14thnation to send a man to outer space.

Post-retirement
Sharma retired as a wing commander and later joined Hindustan Aeronautics Limited (HAL) in 1987, serving as the chief test pilot in the HAL Nashik Division until 1992, before moving on to Bangalore to work as HAL's chief test pilot. Sharma retired from flying in 2001.

Military awards and decorations
Sharma was conferred the honour of the Hero of the Soviet Union upon his return from space. He remains to date the only Indian to have been conferred this honour. India also conferred its highest peacetime gallantry award, the 'Ashoka Chakra', on him and the twoSoviet members of his mission, Malyshev and Strekalov.

The citation for the Ashoka Chakra reads as follows:

Ribbon bar

Personal life
Sharma married Madhu. His son, Kapil, is a film director, while his daughter, Krittika, is a media artist.

Popular culture
A biographical Hindi-language film titled, Saare Jahaan Se Achcha (formerly "Salute"), is under pre-production since 2018.

See also
 Kalpana Chawla
 Sunita Williams
 Ravish Malhotra
 P. Radhakrishnan

References

External links

 Interview with Rakesh Sharma in August 2013
 Rakesh Sharma: Our First Space Man India Today, 9 November 2018

1949 births
Living people
Indian Air Force officers
Indian astronauts
Indian aviators
Indian test pilots
Space programme of India
Foreign Heroes of the Soviet Union
Osmania University alumni
People from Hyderabad, India
People from Patiala
Punjabi people
Punjabi Hindus
Recipients of the Ashoka Chakra (military decoration)
Recipients of the Order of Lenin
Recipients of the Medal "For Merit in Space Exploration"
Ashoka Chakra
Salyut program cosmonauts